Adamsen is a surname. Notable people with the surname include:

Maja Adamsen (born 1978), Danish cyclist
Søren Adamsen / Søren Nico Adamsen, Swedish musician, former member of Crystal Eyes and Artillery
Morten Adamsen (born 1981), Norwegian rower

Surnames from given names